This is a list of technical standardization organizations.

International standards organizations 
 3GPP – 3rd Generation Partnership Project
 3GPP2 – 3rd Generation Partnership Project 2
 ABYC – The American Boat & Yacht Council (ABYC is an international organization, despite its name)
 Accellera – Accellera Organization
 A4L – Access for Learning Community (formerly known as the Schools Interoperability Framework)
 AES – Audio Engineering Society
 AHRI - Air-conditioning, Heating, and Refrigeration Institute
 ASAM – Association for Automation and Measuring Systems
 ASHRAE – American Society of Heating, Refrigerating and Air-Conditioning Engineers (ASHRAE is an international organization, despite its name)
 ASME – American Society of Mechanical Engineers
 ASTM International - American Society for Testing and Materials
 ATIS – Alliance for Telecommunications Industry Solutions
 AUTOSAR – AUTomotive Open System ARchitecture
 BIPM, CGPM, and CIPM – Bureau International des Poids et Mesures and the related organizations established under the Metre Convention of 1875. 
 CableLabs – Cable Television Laboratories
 CCC – Car Connectivity Consortium
 CCSDS – Consultative Committee for Space Data Sciences
 CIE – International Commission on Illumination
 CISPR – International Special Committee on Radio Interference
 CFA – Compact flash association
 DCMI - Dublin Core Metadata Initiative
 DDEX – Digital Data Exchange
 DMSC - Digital Metrology Standards Consortium
 DMTF – Distributed Management Task Force
 Ecma International – Ecma International (previously called ECMA)
 EKOenergy – EKOenergy Network managed by environmental NGOs
 FAO – Food and Agriculture Organization of the United Nations
 FAI – Fédération Aéronautique Internationale
 GS1 – Global supply chain standards (identification numbers, barcodes, electronic commerce transactions, RFID)
 HGI – Home Gateway Initiative
 HFSB – Hedge Fund Standards Board
 HROpen – Human Resource (HR) data exchange standards body
 IABTL – IAB Tech Lab (Advertising Technology Standards)
 IAQG – International Aerospace Quality Group (Aerospace Quality Standards)
 IATA – International Air Transport Association
 ICAO – International Civil Aviation Organization
 IEC – International Electrotechnical Commission
 IEEE – Institute of Electrical and Electronics Engineers
IEEE-SA – IEEE Standards Association
 IETF – Internet Engineering Task Force
 IFOAM – International Federation of Organic Agriculture Movements
 IFSWF – International Forum of Sovereign Wealth Funds
 IMO – International Maritime Organization
 IMS – IMS Global Learning Consortium
 ISO – International Organization for Standardization
ISSN -International Standard Serial Number centre
 IPTC – International Press Telecommunications Council
 ITU – The International Telecommunication Union
 ITU-R – ITU Radiocommunications Sector (formerly known as CCIR)
 ITU-T – ITU Telecommunications Sector (formerly known as CCITT)
 ITU-D – ITU Telecom Development (formerly known as BDT)
 IUPAC – International Union of Pure and Applied Chemistry
 Khronos Group - Khronos Group
 Liberty Alliance – Liberty Alliance
 Media Grid – Media Grid Standards Organization
 NACE International – Formerly known as National Association of Corrosion Engineers
 NEMA – National Electrical Manufacturers Association
 OASIS – Organization for the Advancement of Structured Information Standards
 OCF – Open Connectivity Foundation
 OGC – Open Geospatial Consortium
 OHICC – Organization of Hotel Industry Classification & Certification
 OIF – Optical Internetworking Forum
 OMA – Open Mobile Alliance
 OMG – Object Management Group
 OGF – Open Grid Forum (merger of Global Grid Forum (GGF) and Enterprise Grid Alliance (EGA))
 OpenTravel Alliance – OpenTravel Alliance (previously known as OTA
 OSGi – OSGi Alliance
 PESC – P20 Education Standards Council
 SAE – SAE International, formerly named the Society of Automotive Engineers
 SAI – Social Accountability International
 SDA – Secure Digital Association
 SNIA – Storage Networking Industry Association
 SMPTE – Society of Motion Picture and Television Engineers
 SSDA – Solid State Drive Alliance
 The Open Group – The Open Group
 TIA – Telecommunications Industry Association
 TM Forum – Telemanagement Forum
 UIC – International Union of Railways
 UL – Underwriters Laboratories
 Unicode Consortium - Unicode Consortium
 UPU – Universal Postal Union
 WMO – World Meteorological Organization
 W3C – World Wide Web Consortium
 WSA – Website Standards Association
 WHO biological standards – Mostly developed by NIBSC
 XSF – The XMPP Standards Foundation

Regional standards organizations

Africa 

 ARSO – African Organization for Standardization
 SADCSTAN – Southern African Development Community (SADC) Cooperation in Standardization
 SON – Standard Organization of Nigeria

Americas 

COPANT – Pan American Standards Commission
 AMN – MERCOSUR Standardization Association
 CROSQ – CARICOM Regional Organization for Standards and Quality
 AAQG – America's Aerospace Quality Group

Asia Pacific 

 PASC – Pacific Area Standards Congress
 ACCSQ – ASEAN Consultative Committee for Standards and Quality

Europe
 
 CEN – European Committee for Standardization
 CENELEC – European Committee for Electrotechnical Standardization
 ECSS – European Cooperation for Space Standardization
 EIGA – European Industrial Gases Association
 ETSI – European Telecommunications Standards Institute
 EURAMET – European Association of National Metrology Institutes
 IRMM – Institute for Reference Materials and Measurements (European Union)
 EASC – Euro-Asian Council for Standardization, Metrology and Certification
 RoyalCert International Registrars
 WELMEC – European Cooperation in Legal Metrology

Middle East 

 AIDMO – Arab Industrial Development and Mining Organization
 IAU* – International Arabic Union

Nationally-based standards organizations 
This list is not limited to ISO members.
 Afghanistan – ANSA – Afghan National Standard Authority
 Algeria – IANOR – 
 Argentina – IRAM – 
 Armenia – SARM – National Institute of Standards and Quality
 Australia – SA – Standards Australia
 Austria – ASI – Austrian Standards International
 Bahrain – BSMD
 Bangladesh – BSTI – Bangladesh Standards and Bangladesh Standards and Testing Institution
 Barbados – BNSI – Barbados National Standards Institution 
 Belarus – BELST – Committee for Standardization, Metrology and Certification of Belarus
 Belgium – NBN – / (formerly: IBN/BIN)
 Belgium – BEC / CEB – The Belgian Electrotechnical Committee – Belgisch Elektrotechnisch Comité – Comité Electrotechnique Belge 
 Bolivia – IBNORCA – 
Botswana – BOBS – Botswana Bureau of Standards
 Bosnia and Herzegovina – BASMP – Institute for Standards, Metrology and Intellectual Property of Bosnia and Herzegovina
 Brazil – ABNT – 
 Brunei Darussalam – CPRU – Construction Planning and Research Unit, Ministry of Development
 Bulgaria – BDS – Bulgarian Institute for Standardization
 Canada
 SCC – Standards Council of Canada
 CSA – Canadian Standards Association
 Centre for Study of Insurance Operations
 Chile – INN – 
 China – SAC – Standardization Administration of China
 China – CSSN – China Standards Information Center
 Colombia – ICONTEC – Instituto Colombiano de Normas Tecnicas y Certificación
 Costa Rica – INTECO – 
 Croatia – DZNM – State Office for Standardization and Metrology
 Cuba – NC – 
 Czech Republic – CSNI – Czech Standards Institute
 Denmark – DS – Dansk Standard
 Ecuador – INEN – 
 Egypt – EO – Egyptian Organization for Standardization and Quality Control
 El Salvador – CONACYT – 
 Estonia – EVS – Eesti Standardikeskus
 Ethiopia – QSAE – Quality and Standards Authority of Ethiopia 
 Finland – SFS – Finnish Standards Association
 France – AFNOR – Association française de normalisation
 Germany 
 DIN – 
 DKE –  
 
 Georgia – GEOSTM – Georgian National Agency for Standards, Technical Regulations and Metrology
 Ghana GSA- Ghana Standards Authority
 Greece – ELOT – Hellenic Organization for Standardization
 Grenada – GDBS – Grenada Bureau of Standards
 Guatemala – COGUANOR – Comisión Guatemalteca de Normas
 Guyana – GNBS – Guyana National Bureau of Standards
 Hong Kong – ITCHKSAR – Innovation and Technology Commission
 Hungary – MSZT – Magyar Szabványügyi Testület
 Iceland – IST – Icelandic Council for Standardization
 India – BIS – Bureau of Indian Standards
 Indonesia – BSN – Badan Standardisasi Nasional
 Iran – ISIRI – Institute of Standards and Industrial Research of Iran
 Ireland – NSAI – National Standards Authority of Ireland
 Israel – SII – The Standards Institution of Israel
 Italy – UNI – Ente Nazionale Italiano di Unificazione
 Jamaica – BSJ – Bureau of Standards, Jamaica
 Japan – JISC – Japan Industrial Standards Committee
 Jordan – JISM – Jordan Institution for Standards and Metrology
 Kazakhstan – KAZMEMST – Committee for Standardization, Metrology and Certification
 Kenya – KEBS – Kenya Bureau of Standards
 Republic of Korea – KATS – Korean Agency for Technology and Standards
 Kuwait – KOWSMD – Public Authority for Industry, Standards and Industrial Services Affairs
 Kyrgyzstan – KYRGYZST – State Inspection for Standardization and Metrology
 Latvia – LVS – Latvian Standard
 Lebanon – LIBNOR – Lebanese Standards Institution
 Lithuania – LST – Lithuanian Standards Board
 Luxembourg – SEE – 
 Malaysia – DSM – Department of Standards Malaysia
 Malta – MSA – Malta Standards Authority
 Mauritius – MSB – Mauritius Standards Bureau
 Mexico – DGN – 
 Moldova – MOLDST – Department of Standardization and Metrology
 Morocco – SNIMA – 
 Nepal – NBSM— Nepal Bureau of Standards and Metrology
 Netherlands – NEN – Nederlandse Norm, maintained by the Nederlands Normalisatie Instituut (NNI)
 New Zealand – SNZ – Standards New Zealand
 Nicaragua – DTNM – 
 Nigeria – SON – Standards Organisation of Nigeria
 Norway – SN – Standards Norway (Standard Norge)
 Oman – DGSM – Directorate General for Specifications and Measurements
 Pakistan – PSQCA – Pakistan Standards and Quality Control Authority
 Palestine – PSI – Palestine Standards Institution
 Panama – COPANIT – 
 Papua New Guinea – NISIT – National Institute of Standards and Industrial Technology
 Peru – INDECOPI – 
 Philippines – BPS – Bureau of Product Standards
 Poland – PKN – Polish Committee for Standardization
 Portugal – IPQ – 
 Romania – ASRO – Asociatia de Standardizare din România
 Russian Federation – Rosstandart – Federal Technical Regulation and Metrology Agency
 Saint Lucia – SLBS – Saint Lucia Bureau of Standards
 Saudi Arabia – SASO – Saudi Arabian Standards Organization
 Serbia and Montenegro – ISSM -Institution for Standardization of Serbia and Montenegro
 Seychelles – SBS – Seychelles Bureau of Standards
 Singapore – SPRING SG – Standards, Productivity and Innovation Board
 Slovakia – SUTN – Slovak Standards Institute
 Slovenia – SIST – Slovenian Institute for Standardization
 Somalia – SOBS – Somali Bureau of Standards
 South Africa – SABS – South African Bureau of Standards
 Spain – UNE—  (AENOR)
 Sri Lanka – SLSI – Sri Lanka Standards Institution
 Suriname – SSB – Suriname Standards Bureau
 Sweden – SIS – Swedish Standards Institute
 Switzerland – SNV – Swiss Association for Standardization
 Syrian Arab Republic – SASMO – The Syrian Arab Organization for Standardization and Metrology
 Taiwan (Republic of China) – BSMI – The Bureau of Standards, Metrology and Inspection
 Tanzania – TBS – Tanzania Bureau of Standards
 Thailand – TISI – Thai Industrial Standards Institute
 Trinidad and Tobago – TTBS – Trinidad and Tobago Bureau of Standards
 Turkey – TSE – Türk Standardlari Enstitüsü
 Uganda – UNBS – Uganda National Bureau of Standards
 Ukraine – DSSU – State Committee for Technical Regulation and Consumer Policy of Ukraine
 United Arab Emirates – ESMA – Emirates Standardization and Metrology Association
 United Kingdom 
 BSI – British Standards Institution aka BSI Group
 DStan – UK Defence Standardization
 United States of America
 ANSI – American National Standards Institute
 ACI – American Concrete Institute
 NISO – National Information Standards Organization 
 NIST – National Institute of Standards and Technology
 Uruguay – UNIT – 
 Venezuela – FONDONORMA – 
 Vietnam – TCVN – Directorate for Standards and Quality

See also
 Standards organization
 Technical Standard

References

External links
 Open Standards Organizations